Geophis godmani, also known as Godman's earth snake, is a snake of the colubrid family. It is found in Costa Rica and Panama.

References

Geophis
Snakes of North America
Reptiles of Costa Rica
Reptiles of Panama
Taxa named by George Albert Boulenger
Reptiles described in 1894